Campbell Hall station is a commuter rail stop on the Metro-North Railroad's Port Jervis Line, located just south of the eponymous hamlet in the town of Hamptonburgh in Orange County, New York, United States. The station is located at the end of Watkins Road, off Egbertson Road (County Route 77) a short distance from NY 207 near its intersection with NY 416. The station contains decorative lights, a long platform roof and an elevated mini-high platform at the east end of the station for access by riders in wheelchairs. Parking is on a permit/meter system.

The station is on the site of MQ Crossing, the former junction of the Erie Railroad Graham Line, a then freight-only bypass of Middletown, and the railroad's Montgomery Branch, which provided service south to Goshen and north to the village of Montgomery. The former Campbell Hall station was located on the Montgomery Branch, at the crossing with NY 207. Service at the current Campbell Hall station began on April 18, 1983 when the Metropolitan Transportation Authority moved service off the former Erie Railroad main line onto the Graham Line.

Station layout
The station has two tracks and a low-level side platform with a pathway connecting the platform to the bypass track. The station is where the Erie's Montgomery Branch once intersected the Graham Line and where the former Wallkill Valley Railroad connects to the mainline via an active wye. The Middletown and New Jersey Railroad still runs freight operations up to customers in Maybrook, Montgomery, and the end of the tracks in Walden with its recent takeover of local freight operations from Norfolk Southern. A small yard for the freight carrier, with unused stock stored along several sidings, is located at and just west of the station.

References

External links

Metro-North Railroad stations in New York (state)
Railway stations in Orange County, New York
Wallkill Valley Railroad
NJ Transit Rail Operations stations
Railway stations in the United States opened in 1983
1983 establishments in New York (state)